The 1939 NCAA Swimming and Diving Championships were contested March 24, 1938 at the third annual NCAA-sanctioned swim meet to determine the team and individual national champions of men's collegiate swimming and diving in the United States. 

This year's event was hosted at the Intramural Sports Building at the University of Michigan in Ann Arbor.

For the third consecutive year, Michigan topped rivals Ohio State in the team standings, earning the host Wolverines their third national title. Michigan were coached by Matt Mann.

Team results
Note: Top 10 only
(H) = Hosts

See also
List of college swimming and diving teams

References

NCAA Division I Men's Swimming and Diving Championships
NCAA Swimming And Diving Championships
NCAA Swimming And Diving Championships
Sports in Ann Arbor, Michigan